Randall Davey (1887 – 1964) was an American painter and art educator. He taught art at several institutions, including the University of New Mexico, and he had his studio in Santa Fe, New Mexico. His artwork can be seen in museums across the U.S.

Early life and education
Davey was born East Orange, New Jersey in 1887. He graduated from Cornell University in 1909.

Career 
Davey taught art at the School of the Art Institute of Chicago, the Kansas City Art Institute, and the Broadmoor Art Academy. He also taught at the University of New Mexico from 1945 to 1956.

Davey moved to Santa Fe, New Mexico in 1919, where he established a studio at his Randall Davey House. He was primarily a portrait and equine painter, but he also painted landscapes and still lifes. His artwork was acquired by the Detroit Institute of Arts, the Whitney Museum of American Art, and the Corcoran Art Gallery. It was exhibited at the Museum of Modern Art in 1933-1934. His work was also part of the painting event in the art competition at the 1932 Summer Olympics.

Personal life 
Davey had a son, William. He was predeceased by his wife. He died in a car accident near Baker, California in November 1964.

References

1887 births
1964 deaths
American landscape painters
American male painters
American portrait painters
American still life painters
American art educators
Artists from Santa Fe, New Mexico
Cornell University alumni
Equine artists
Kansas City Art Institute faculty
Painters from New Mexico
People from East Orange, New Jersey
School of the Art Institute of Chicago faculty
University of New Mexico faculty
20th-century American painters
Olympic competitors in art competitions
20th-century American male artists